Markowa  is a village in Łańcut County, Subcarpathian Voivodeship, in south-eastern Poland. It is the seat of the gmina (administrative district) called Gmina Markowa. The village has a population of 4,100.

History
The village was founded in the 14th century by the Polish noble family of Pilecki, and was settled by the descendants of Germans colonists, who called it Markhof. The Pileckis also founded a Catholic parish in the village.

During World War II it was under German occupation.

On 24 March 1944 a patrol of German police came to the house of Józef and Wiktoria Ulma, where they found eight Jewish members of the Szall and Goldman families. At first the Germans executed all the Jews. Then they shot the pregnant Wiktoria and her husband. When the six children began to scream at the sight of their parents' bodies, Joseph Kokott, a German police officer (Volksdeutsche from Sudetenland), shot them after consulting with his superior. The other killers were Eilert Dieken, Michael Dziewulski and Erich Wilde. Afterwards the Germans robbed the house and workshop of the Ulma family and organized an alcoholic libation. On the 60th anniversary of this tragedy, a memorial was erected in memory of the family. Other Polish families also hid Jews in Markowa, and at least 17 Jews survived the German occupation and the Holocaust in five Polish homes.

The Markowa Ulma-Family Museum of Poles Who Saved Jews in World War II is located in the village.

See also

 Walddeutsche
 Rescue of Jews by Poles during the Holocaust

References

Bibliography
 The Righteous and their world. Markowa through the lens of Józef Ulma, by Mateusz Szpytma, Institute of National Remembrance, Poland
Franciszek Kotula, "Pochodzenie domów przysłupowych w Rzeszowskiem." Kwartalnik Historii Kultury Materialnej Jahr. V., Nr. 3/4, 1957, S. 557

Notes

External links

 Story of the survival of the Riesenbach family
 Gisele Hildebrandt, Otto Adamski. Dorfimfersuchungen in dem alten deutsch-ukrainischen Grenzbereich von Landshuf. 1943. Kraków. Markowa

Villages in Łańcut County
14th-century establishments in Poland
Populated places established in the 14th century